Area codes 704 and 980 are telephone area codes in the North American Numbering Plan (NANP) for Charlotte and all or part of 12 surrounding counties in south-central North Carolina. Other major cities in the service area are Gastonia, Kannapolis, Concord, Mooresville, Salisbury, Statesville, and Shelby.  The South Carolina side of the Charlotte metropolitan area is part of area codes 803 and 839. Area code 704 is one of the original area codes assigned to numbering plan areas (NPAs) by AT&T in October 1947. Area code 980 was added in an overlay numbering plan in 2000.

History
The original area code, 704, was one of the original 86 numbering plan areas (NPAs) designated by AT&T in 1947, and originally covered the entire state of North Carolina. In 1954, the eastern two-thirds of the state–everything from Winston-Salem eastward–was split off as area code 919. 704 was reduced to the western third of the state, from Charlotte through the Blue Ridge Mountains to the Tennessee border.

This configuration remained in place for the next 44 years. Despite explosive growth in Charlotte, the state's largest city, the western third of the state was not as densely populated as the eastern two-thirds, which grew from having one area code to four during the 1990s. However, by the mid-1990s, Charlotte's rapid growth and the ensuing demand for telephone lines made a split inevitable. The number shortage was exacerbated by the proliferation of cell phones, pagers and fax machines. In 1998, most of the western portion of the old 704 territories, including the Foothills and Blue Ridge, were split off to create area code 828, restricting 704 to the Charlotte area.

The creation of 828 was intended as a long-term solution. Within two years, however, 704 was close to exhaustion once again due to Charlotte's continued growth, as well as the continued proliferation of cell phones and pagers.

To solve the problem, it was decided to assign 980 to Charlotte as North Carolina's first overlay. 980 entered service on May 1, 2000. On that date, a permissive dialing period began in which both 7- and 10-digit calls were both allowed. As of January 10, 2001, 10-digit dialling was mandatory. The first 980 numbers were assigned on February 10, 2001.

Even with the Charlotte area's continued growth, the 704/980 numbering pool is nowhere near exhaustion. Under the most recent NANP projections, the Charlotte area will not need another area code until at least mid-2047.

Years after the introduction of mobile number portability, a number of cell phone customers on the South Carolina side of the Charlotte area have 704 numbers.

Service area

Counties
Alexander (A southeast sliver is in 704/980. Most of the county is in 828.)
Anson
Cabarrus
Catawba (Slivers in southeast and northeast are in 704/980.  Most of the county is in 828.)
Cleveland (except sliver in southwest which is in 828)
Gaston
Iredell
Lincoln
Mecklenburg (All landline phone numbers in Charlotte-Mecklenburg public schools use 980 area code.)
Rowan
Rutherford (small area east of Hollis)
Stanly
Union

Cities and towns

Albemarle
Belmont
Bessemer City
Boiling Springs
Charlotte
All Charlotte–Mecklenburg Public School landlines use the 980 area code.
Cherryville
China Grove
Cleveland
Concord
Cornelius
Dallas
Denver
Davidson
Gastonia
Harmony
Harrisburg
Huntersville
Indian Trail
Kannapolis
Landis
Lincolnton
Love Valley
Matthews
Mint Hill
Monroe
Mooresville
Mount Holly
Mount Ulla
Olin
Pineville
Rockwell
Salisbury
Shelby
Spencer
Stallings
Statesville
Troutman
Wadesboro
Waxhaw
Wingate

See also
 List of North Carolina area codes
 List of NANP area codes

References

External links

 List of exchanges from AreaCodeDownload.com, 704 Area Code
 List of exchanges from AreaCodeDownload.com, 980 Area Code

704
704
Telecommunications-related introductions in 1947
Telecommunications-related introductions in 2001